Els Vilars d'Engordany, or simply Els Vilars, is a village in Andorra, located in the parish of Escaldes-Engordany. It is part of the contiguous urban area of Escaldes-Engordany and Andorra La Vella, and has panoramic views over the capital and the Gran Valira river valley.

References

Populated places in Andorra
Escaldes-Engordany